Nicolet College is a public 2-year technical college whose main campus is in Rhinelander, Wisconsin. It has outreach centers in Carter, Crandon, Eagle River, the Forest County Potawatomi Community, Lac du Flambeau, Minocqua, Mole Lake, and Tomahawk.

It is one of 16 colleges in the Wisconsin Technical College System. Created in 1967, the Nicolet district covers all of Oneida, Vilas and Forest counties and portions of Lincoln, Langlade and Iron counties.

History 
The Nicolet College District was created in 1967 with classes starting in January 1968. Shortly after the district was formed, college officials purchased 280 acres just south of Rhinelander to build the Lake Julia Campus. The first building, the Science Center, now the University Student Center, was constructed in 1969 and 1970. While that was being built, the college held its first classes in downtown Rhinelander in what is now the Rhinelander Fire Department.

Academics
Nicolet offers 70 degrees, diplomas, and certificates. Classes are offered during the day, in the evening, and online. Students may be enrolled part-time or full-time. Nicolet offers international studies, transfer agreements, and university transfer liberal arts programs.

Student body 
Nicolet has an enrollment of about 2,000 students aged 18 and older. Annually more than 10,000 people attend events and courses held at Nicolet.

References

External links
Official website

Wisconsin technical colleges
Education in Oneida County, Wisconsin
Rhinelander, Wisconsin
Educational institutions established in 1967
1967 establishments in Wisconsin